Promysla is an urban locality (an urban-type settlement) in Gornozavodsky District of Perm Krai, Russia. Population:

History 
The settlement has been known since 1825, when gold placers were discovered on the Poludenka River. The original name of the settlement was "Krestovozdvizhenskie Zolotvennye Furs", Krestovozdvizhenskoe village. The head office of Krestovozdvizhenskie gold placers was situated in the settlement.

In 1829 the goldsmith Paul Popov discovered in the vicinity of the village the first diamond in Russia weighing 0.5 carats, for which he received a free hand.

Administrative status of township was received on July 30, 1943.

References

Urban-type settlements in Perm Krai